Predrag Pažin (Bulgarian and Serbian Cyrillic: Предраг Пажин; born 14 March 1973) is a naturalized Bulgarian former football player of Herzegovinian Serb descent who played as a defender.

Club career
He signed his first professional contract with Sutjeska from Nikšić, where he played from 1991 to 1993. Then, until 1995, he played for Rudar from Pljevlja. When in January he moved to Partizan. While he was playing for Partizan, he had an incident with Mateja Kežman during the match that Partizan played against Lazio. After one unsuccessful attack, Pažin blamed Kežman, to which he responded with insults, which caused Pažin to hit him. With Partizan, he was three times the champion of Yugoslavia and once the cup winner. When NATO bombed FR Yugoslavia in 1999, the championship was interrupted, Pažin was out of contract and, in May of the same year, he went to Werder Bremen for a ten-day trial. 

He did not sign a contract with Werder, but he received an invitation from Ljupko Petrović, the coach of Levski Sofia at the time. With Levski, he won the title and the Bulgarian Cup, and was declared the best foreign player. He spent two seasons in Bulgaria during which he was offered citizenship and a chance to play for the country's national team - both of which he took. However, he was suddenly sold to Turkish side Kocaelispor, to which he moved in 2001. He won the cup in Turkey, but did not stay there long, so the following year he returned to Bulgaria, where he played for Spartak Pleven. 

In the same year, he went to China, where he played for Beijing Guoan, coached by Ljupko Petrović. After China, in 2003 he moved to the Ukrainian Shakhtar Donetsk, for which he would play until 2005. He won the Ukrainian Cup with Shakhtar in 2004. He returned to China again in 2005, where he played for Shandong Luneng until 2007. The following year, he won the championship and the Cup of China. In the AFC Champions League match, which Shandong played against Al-Ittihad, Pažin was accused of spitting at the referee for which he was punished. The last club he played for was Lokomotiv Mezdra, from 2008 to 2010, where he ended his playing career.

International career
Pažin made his debut for Bulgaria in an August 2000 friendly match against Belgium in Sofia and has earned a total of 31 caps, scoring no goals. He was part of the Bulgarian 2004 European Football Championship team, which was eliminated in the first round, finishing bottom of Group C, having finished top of Qualifying Group 8 in the pre-tournament phase. His final international was against Italy at that tournament in Portugal.  Pažin is the most capped non-Bulgarian-born player to appear for the national side.

Honours
Partizan
First League of FR Yugoslavia: 1996, 1997, 1999
FR Yugoslavia Cup: 1998
Levski Sofia
Bulgarian A PFG: 2000
Bulgarian Cup: 2000
Kocaelispor
Turkish Cup: 2002
Shakhtar Donetsk
Ukrainian Premier League: 2005
Ukrainian Cup: 2004
Shandong Luneng
Chinese Super League: 2006
Chinese FA Cup: 2006

References

External links
 Website from LEVSKI2000
 TFF Player Details
 
 
 Profile at LevskiSofia.info

1973 births
Living people
Sportspeople from Nevesinje
Serbs of Bosnia and Herzegovina
Naturalised citizens of Bulgaria
Bosnia and Herzegovina emigrants to Bulgaria
Serbian emigrants to Bulgaria
Bulgarian people of Bosnia and Herzegovina descent
Bulgarian people of Serbian descent
Association football central defenders
Bosnia and Herzegovina footballers
Bulgarian footballers
Bulgaria international footballers
UEFA Euro 2004 players
FK Sutjeska Nikšić players
FK Rudar Pljevlja players
FK Partizan players
PFC Levski Sofia players
Kocaelispor footballers
PFC Spartak Pleven players
Beijing Guoan F.C. players
FC Shakhtar Donetsk players
Shandong Taishan F.C. players
PFC Lokomotiv Mezdra players
Yugoslav First League players
First League of Serbia and Montenegro players
First Professional Football League (Bulgaria) players
Süper Lig players
Chinese Super League players
Ukrainian Premier League players
Second Professional Football League (Bulgaria) players
Bosnia and Herzegovina expatriate footballers
Bulgarian expatriate footballers
Expatriate footballers in Turkey
Bulgarian expatriate sportspeople in Turkey
Expatriate footballers in China
Bulgarian expatriate sportspeople in China
Expatriate footballers in Ukraine
Bulgarian expatriate sportspeople in Ukraine
Bosnia and Herzegovina football managers
Bulgarian football managers